Santa Paula Hospital (SPH) is a hospital in Santa Paula, California, United States.  The hospital is a campus of the Ventura County Medical Center.  SPH has 145 full-time employees, 30 shared patient beds, and 19 private patient rooms.

Services
SPH has departments in radiology, surgery and intensive care.  The hospital operates a 24/7 emergency room

History
Santa Paula Memorial Hospital was founded in 1961 and was built entirely with community donations.

Closure and Re-opening
On December 26, 2003, after years of financial trouble, Santa Paula Memorial Hospital filed Chapter 11 bankruptcy and was forced to close.  The County of Ventura purchased the hospital in September 2005 for $2.75 million.  After spending $4.5 million on renovations and repairs, the hospital was reopened on July 13, 2006.  The hospital has been performing well financially since then.

Three years after reopening, the hospital was noted to be successful.

References

External links
Official Website
This hospital in the CA Healthcare Atlas A project by OSHPD

Hospital buildings completed in 1961
Hospitals in Ventura County, California
Companies that filed for Chapter 11 bankruptcy in 2003
Santa Paula, California